Liam Gray (born 6 September 1994) is a Scottish professional footballer, who plays as a forward.

Career

Livingston
Gray was a youth player at Bathgate Rose, before joining Livingston at youth level in 2010. He was a member of the Livingston under-17 squad that won the SFL Under-17 Youth League Cup, defeating Queen's Park in May 2011. Gray scored twice in a 3–2 win. A member of Livingston's under-19 squad, Gray was promoted to the first-team on 14 April 2012, making his debut aged 17, as a substitute in a 1–0 defeat to Ayr United.

Career statistics

References

External links 
 

1994 births
Living people
Scottish footballers
Association football forwards
Livingston F.C. players
Broxburn Athletic F.C. players
Gala Fairydean Rovers F.C. players
Armadale Thistle F.C. players
Scottish Football League players